China, officially the People's Republic of China, is a country in East Asia.

China may also refer to:

Places

China-related regions, polities, and concepts 
 Dynasties in Chinese history, the historical dynasties that ruled and represented China
 Greater China, a geographical region encompassing mainland China, Hong Kong, Macao, and Taiwan
 Mainland China, the geographical territory controlled by the People's Republic of China, excluding the special administrative regions of Hong Kong and Macao, and territories controlled by the Republic of China
 Taiwan, officially the Republic of China
 Free area of the Republic of China, the geographical territory under the de facto control of the Republic of China, including Taiwan, Penghu, Kinmen, Matsu, and various other minor islands
 Republic of China (1912–1949), a sovereign state based in Mainland China prior to its government's relocation to Taiwan
 China proper, also called "Inner China" or the "Eighteen Provinces", the core part of China during the Qing dynasty
 Little China from the various historical Korean, Vietnamese and Japanese regimes 
 Empire of China (1915–1916), a short-lived state established by Yuan Shikai

United States 
 China, Indiana
 China, Maine
 China Township, Michigan
 China, Missouri
 China, New York
 China, Texas
 China Grove, Texas
 China Spring, Texas

Elsewhere
 China, Kagoshima, a town in Japan
 China, Nuevo León, a municipality in Mexico
 China, Pakistan
 China Beach (Canada), a beach on Vancouver Island, Canada

Film and television
 China (1943 film), a film by John Farrow
 "China" (The Office), an episode of The Office

Music 
 China (band), a hard rock band from Switzerland
 China (China album)
 China (Vangelis album) (1979)
 China (The Parlotones album) (2018)
 "China" (Anuel AA song)
 "China" (Red Rockers song)
 "China" (Tori Amos song)
 China cymbal, a type of accent cymbal
 China Records, a record label

People

Football
 China (footballer, born 1939) born José Ricardo da Silva, Brazilian striker
 China (footballer, born 1948), born Ademir Ueta, Brazilian football forward
 China (footballer, born 1959) born Henrique Valmir da Conceição, Brazilian defensive midfielder
 China (footballer, born 1964) born Carlos Alberto Gomes Kao Yien, Brazilian rightback
 China (footballer, born 1980) born Leonardo Bruno dos Santos Silva, Brazilian rightback
 China (footballer, born 1982) born João Pedro dos Santos Gonçalves, Portuguese leftback
 China (footballer, born 1996), born Rogerio Alves dos Santos, Brazilian football striker

Other uses 
 China (insect), a genus of grasshopper
 China (material) or porcelain
 China (schooner), a schooner destroyed in 1883
 China (Superleague Formula team), a national racing team from China
 1125 China, an asteroid
 HMS Africa, launched 1862, renamed China in the Lay-Osborn Flotilla
 HMHS China, a British hospital ship in World War I
 Smilax china, a plant species
 Chinas, a people mentioned in ancient Indian literature

People with the name
 Edd China (born 1971), British motor specialist
 William Edward China, British entomologist (heteropterist)
 China Chow (born 1974), English actress
 China Kantner (born 1971), American actress
 China Machado (1929–2016), fashion model and editor 
 China Anne McClain (born 1998), American actress and singer
 China Miéville (born 1972), British novelist
 China Moses (born 1978), American singer and television host living in Paris
 China Zorrilla (1922–2014), Uruguayan actress
 China P. Arnold (born 1980), American convicted killer

See also 
 China Lake (disambiguation)
 Chinatown, sometimes referred to as "Little China"
 Republic of China (disambiguation)
 Chinese (disambiguation)
 Chinna (disambiguation)
 Cochinchina, a region in modern Vietnam
 Indochina, a peninsula in Southeast Asia
 Chyna (name), given name and surname, including a list of people with the name
 Cina, a former kingdom absorbed by Luwu in Indonesia